Francesco Gennari (born 4 October 1750  di Langhirano; died 4 December 1797) was an Italian anatomist. He is known for line of Gennari, a macroscopically white band seen in the cerebral cortex of the occipital lobe, which he observed on 2 February 1776 in the course of examining frozen sections of unstained human brain during his study in medical school. He mentioned it in his book De peculiari structura cerebri, nonnulisque ejus morbis, and referred to it as lineola albidior.

The discovery of this part of the brain is considered the first evidence that the cerebral cortex was not uniform in structure.

Gennari attended medical school in Parma, and received a medical degree in 1776. His life declined thereafter, as Gennari became a compulsive gambler, and ultimately died penniless and in relative obscurity.

References

1750 births
1797 deaths
Italian anatomists
People from the Province of Parma